I Am L.V. is the debut solo studio album by American singer L.V. It was released on May 7, 1996 through Tommy Boy Records. The album produced three charted singles: "Throw Your Hands Up", "I Am L.V.", and a reworking of his chart-topping collaboration with Coolio, "Gangsta's Paradise".

Track listing

Notes
 Track 14 is a cover of "Heaven Must Be Like This" by Ohio Players (1974)
Sample credits
Track 1 contains elements from "Bounce, Rock, Skate, Roll" by Vaughan Mason & Crew (1979) and "(Not Just) Knee Deep" by Funkadelic (1979)
Track 2 contains elements from "Mr. Groove" by One Way (1984)
Track 3 contains elements from "Who Is He (And What Is He to You)?" by Bill Withers (1972)
Track 5 contains elements from "The Look of Love" by Isaac Hayes (1970)
Track 8 contains elements from "Pastime Paradise" by Stevie Wonder (1976)
Track 16 contains elements from "Outstanding" by The Gap Band (1982)

Personnel
Larry Sanders – vocals, executive producer, co-producer (tracks: 6–7, 9)
Austin Patterson – producer (tracks: 3, 6–7, 9, 13, 16)
Jasiri Armon Williams – producer (tracks: 1–2, 4–5, 14)
Maurice Thompson – producer (tracks: 1–2, 4–5, 14)
Doug Rasheed – producer (tracks: 8, 10)
Travon Potts – producer (tracks: 12, 15)
Anthony Crawford – producer (track 11)
Montell Du'Sean Barnett – producer (track 11) 
Robert "Fonksta" Bacon – co-producer (tracks: 3, 6–7, 9)
Tomie Mundy – co-producer (tracks: 3, 6–7, 9)
Thomas Coyne – mastering
Paul Stewart – executive producer
Albee – executive producer

Charts

References

External links

1996 debut albums
L.V. (singer) albums
Tommy Boy Records albums
Albums produced by Prodeje